The 1979 New York Cosmos season was the ninth season for the New York Cosmos in the now-defunct North American Soccer League. 1979 saw the club continue their premiership streak to three seasons with the league's highest point total, and match their wins record while achieving a record point total, but the Cosmos' quest for a third straight NASL championship ended with a loss in the conference finals to the Vancouver Whitecaps.

Squad 

Source:

Results 
Source:

Friendlies 
Source:

Preseason

Regular season 
Pld = Games Played, W = Wins, L = Losses, GF = Goals For, GA = Goals Against, Pts = Points
6 points for a win, 1 point for a shootout win, 0 points for a loss, 1 point for each goal scored (up to three per game).

National Eastern Division Standings

Overall League Placing 

Source:

Matches 
April 22, 1979: New York Cosmos 3, Fort Lauderdale Strikers 2 Giants Stadium 72,342

April 29, 1979: New York Cosmos 4, Philadelphia Fury 2 Giants Stadium 46,375

May 4, 1979: New York Cosmos 1, Toronto Blizzard 0 Varsity Stadium 29,483

May 6, 1979: New York Cosmos 3, Houston Hurricane 0 Giants Stadium 50,142

May 12, 1979: Tampa Bay Rowdies 3, New York Cosmos 2 Tampa Stadium 40,701

May 20, 1979: New York Cosmos 3, Tulsa Roughnecks 1 Giants Stadium 46,344

May 26, 1979: New York Cosmos 1, Portland Timber 1 (Cosmos won in shootout) Civic Center 18,254

May 28, 1979: Chicago Sting 3, New York Cosmos 1 Wrigley Field 21,127

June 3, 1979: New York Cosmos 3, Toronto Blizzard 1 Giants Stadium 38,762

June 9, 1979: New York Cosmos 4, Dallas Tornado 1 Giants Stadium 45,031

June 13, 1979: New York Cosmos 3, Tulsa Roughnecks 2 Skelly Stadium 30,162

June 16, 1979: Vancouver Whitecaps 4, New York Cosmos 1 Empire Stadium 32,372

June 20, 1979: Minnesota Kicks 3, New York Cosmos 2 Metropolitan Stadium 43,952

June 24, 1979: New York Cosmos 1, New England Tea Men 0 Giants Stadium 41,428

June 27, 1979: New York Cosmos 3, Portland Timber 1 Giants Stadium 33,721

July 1, 1979: New York Cosmos 5, Rochester Lancers 2 Giants Stadium 40,379

July 7, 1979: New York Cosmos 2, New England Tea Men 1 Foxboro Stadium 15,763

July 11, 1979: New York Cosmos 1, Seattle Sounders 1 (Sounders won in shootout) Giants Stadium 40,207

JUly 15, 1979: Vancouver Whitecaps 4, New York Cosmos 2 Giants Stadium 48,753

July 18, 1979: New York Cosmos 4, Fort Lauredale Strikers 3 Lockhart Stadium 19,850

July 21, 1979: New York Cosmos 1, Philadelphia Fury 0 Veterans Stadium 17,352

July 25, 1979: New York Cosmos 4, Minnesota Kicks 1 Giants Stadium 57,223

July 29, 1979: New York Cosmos 5, San Jose Earthquakes 0 Giants Stadium 35,450

August 1, 1979: New York Cosmos 3, Los Angeles Aztecs 1 Rose Bowl 38,606

August 5, 1979: New York Cosmos 4, Rochester Lancers 2 Holleder Memorial Stadium 18,881

August 8, 1979: New York Cosmos 4, Tampa Bay Rowdies 3 Giants Stadium 70,042

August 12, 1979: New York Cosmos 4, Washington Diplomats 4 (Cosmos won in a shootout) Giants Stadium 34,599

Postseason

Overview

First round

Conference semifinals

Conference Championships

Soccer Bowl '79

See also
1979 North American Soccer League season
List of New York Cosmos seasons

References

New York
New York Cosmos seasons
New York
New York Cosmos